Abel Faivre (30 March 1867 – 13 August 1945) was a French painter, illustrator and cartoonist.

Early life and work

Jules Abel Faivre was born in Lyon, France. He attended École nationale des beaux-arts de Lyon for three years. He then attended the Société Nationale des Beaux-Arts and Académie Julian. He was a member of the Société des Artistes Français. He lived in La Croix-Valmer. Professionally, he created propaganda posters for the French Army in World War I. He drew comics for Le Rire, L'Écho de Paris, and Le Figaro.

Later life and legacy

Faivre died on 13 August 1945 in Nice, France. A boulevard is named after Faivre in La Croix-Valmer. His work is held in the collections of the National Library of Medicine, the University of Michigan, the Museum of Modern Art. and the Brooklyn Museum.

Collections 
 Musée d'Orsay, La Femme à l'éventail, Nature morte à l'aiguière et aux fruits
 British Museum
 Chicago Art Institute

Gallery

References

External links

Abel Faivre on artnet
 Abel Faivre on Gallica French archives

1945 deaths
1867 births
19th-century French painters
French male painters
20th-century French painters
20th-century French male artists
French cartoonists
People from Var (department)
Artists from Lyon
Académie Julian alumni
People from Nice
19th-century French male artists